The 1951 Copa Rio was the first edition of the Copa Rio, the first intercontinental club football tournament with teams from Europe and South America, held in Rio de Janeiro and São Paulo from 30 June to 22 July. Participant clubs were divided into two zones of four teams, playing each other once in a single round-robin tournament.

The tournament featured players such as Vavá, Ademir of Vasco da Gama, Jair da Rosa Pinto of Palmeiras, José Santamaría, Walter Taibo, goalkeeper Anibal Paz, Luis Volpi of Nacional, Branko Stankovic, Rajko Mitic of Red Star Belgrade, Giampiero Boniperti, Danish Karl Aage Præst and John Hansen of Juventus, José Travassos of Sporting Lisbon, and Swedish Lennart Samuelsson and Antoine Bonifaci of Nice. Juventus's coach was legendary Hungarian György Sárosi.

The final was played in a two-legged format, contested by Brazilian team Palmeiras and Italian side Juventus. Palmeiras won the series 2–1 on points, achieving their first Copa Rio trophy.

Participants 

Notes

Venues

Tournament course

Rio de Janeiro Group 
All matches played at Maracanã Stadium

30 June: Austria Wien 4−0 Nacional
1 July: Vasco da Gama 5−1 Sporting CP
3 July: Nacional 3−2 Sporting CP
5 July: Vasco da Gama 5−1 Austria Wien
7 July: Sporting CP 1−2 Austria Wien
8 July: Vasco da Gama 2−1 Nacional

São Paulo Group 
All matches played at Pacaembu Stadium.

30 June: Palmeiras 3−0 OGC Nice
1 July: Juventus 3−2 Red Star
3 July: OGC Nice 2−3 Juventus
5 July: Palmeiras 2−1 Red Star
7 July: Red Star 1−2 OGC Nice
8 July: Palmeiras 0−4 Juventus

Semi-finals
São Paulo
12 July: Austria Wien 3−3 Juventus
14 July: Juventus 3−1 Austria Wien

Rio de Janeiro
12 July: Vasco da Gama 1−2 Palmeiras
15 July: Vasco da Gama 0−0 Palmeiras

Finals

Match details 

Palmeiras won the series 2–1 on points

References 

c
c
r
r